Advanced Style is a 2014 American documentary film directed by Lina Plioplyte. The film details the history and values of the fashion blog of the same name, curated by street photographer Ari Seth Cohen, through the lives of seven unique New Yorkers whose style have guided their approach to ageing.

The film was released theatrically, digitally, and on DVD in the United States on September 26, 2014, by Bond/360.

Synopsis
Seven New York City women, aged 62 to 95, are profiled in the film. All the women had been photographed by Cohen for his blog and through their fashion challenge convention ideas about beauty, ageing and obsession with youth. The film unpacks the private lives of its subjects and their personal philosophies on fashion, body image and self-confidence.

Advanced Style also documents the history of Cohen's blog, which had been originally started to cope with the loss of his maternal grandmother. Cohen explains that he believes beauty should not be the domain of the young, a statement agreed by Simon Doonan, Iris Apfel and Dita Von Teese who cameo in the documentary. The film also charts the women finding newfound fame due to Cohen's blog, which culminates with an appearance on The Ricki Lake Show.

Reception
On Rotten Tomatoes, the film holds an approval rating of 89% based on 38 reviews, with an average rating of 6.90/10. The site's critics consensus reads: "Colorful, witty, and uplifting, Advanced Style celebrates life and pays tribute to those who flout convention." On Metacritic, it has a weighted average score of 66 out of 100, based on 11 reviews, indicating "generally favorable reviews". Writing for the Los Angeles Times, Sheri Linden wrote, "The way the women occupy Cohen and Plioplyte's spotlight is a lesson in aging well, a lesson that begins with the refusal to play by the rule that says to grow older, especially for women, is to fade into the shadows."

References

External links
 Advanced Style blog maintained by Cohen
 

2014 films
2014 documentary films
American documentary films
Documentary films about New York City
Documentary films about old age
Documentary films about women
Films about fashion in the United States
Women in New York City
2010s English-language films
2010s American films
English-language documentary films